John W. Freitag (May 3, 1877 – October 20, 1932) was an American rower who competed in the 1904 Summer Olympics.

He was born in Columbia, Illinois in 1877 and died in St. Louis, Missouri in 1932. In 1904 he was part of the American boat that won the bronze medal in the coxless four.

References

External links
 profile

1877 births
1932 deaths
Rowers at the 1904 Summer Olympics
Olympic bronze medalists for the United States in rowing
American male rowers
Medalists at the 1904 Summer Olympics